The 2023 season will be the Seattle Seahawks' upcoming 48th in the National Football League (NFL) and their 14th under the head coach/general manager tandem of Pete Carroll and John Schneider. The Seahawks will attempt to improve upon their 9-8 record from the previous year and make the playoffs in back to back seasons for the first time since 2019 and 2020.

Draft

Staff

Current roster

Preseason
The Seahawks' preseason opponents and schedule will be announced in the spring.

Regular season

2023 opponents
Listed below are the Seahawks' opponents for 2023. Exact dates and times will be announced in the spring.

References

External links
 

Seattle
Seattle Seahawks seasons
Seattle Seahawks